The Anticapitalist Workers' Left (IAT) was a Trotskyist political party in Chile.

The party emerged after the Revolutionary Workers Party was dissolved by the Electoral Service after failing to obtain the necessary votes to survive in the 2017 general election.

References

External links
 La Izquierda Diario Official web site

2018 establishments in Chile
2020 disestablishments in Chile
Communist parties in Chile
Far-left politics in Chile
Political parties established in 2018
Political parties disestablished in 2020
Chile
Trotskyist organisations in Chile